An American Daughter (also known as Trial by Media) is a 2000 Lifetime Television film directed by Sheldon Larry. The teleplay was written by Wendy Wasserstein, based on her 1997 play of the same name.

Plot
Dr. Lyssa Dent Hughes (Lahti) is the daughter of U.S. Senator Alan Hughes (Stanley Anderson). She appears to be headed for nomination as the U.S. Surgeon General until a background check reveals she once neglected to return a jury duty notice. Then, she makes a faux pas in comments about her homemaker mother that leaves her open to a media blitz and her certain nomination suddenly appears to be in doubt. She is supported by her best friend, Judith Kaufman (Lynne Thigpen), an "African American Jewish feminist" physician, who has her own set of troubles.

Cast
 Christine Lahti as Lyssa Dent Hughes
 Tom Skerritt as Walter Abrahmson
 Jay Thomas as Timber Tucker
 Mark Feuerstein as Morrow McCarthy
 Lynn Thigpen as Dr. Judith Kaufman
 Stanley Anderson as Sen. Alan Hughes
 Blake Lindsley as Quincy Quince
 Scott Michael Campbell as Billy Robbins
 Matt Weinberg as Nicholas
 Will Rothhaar as Kip
 Caroline Aaron as Veronica
 Teri Austin as Greta
 Karen Kim as Hope
 Cynthia Harris as Charlotte "Chubby" Hughes

Production
The made-for-TV film was broadcast on the Lifetime network in June 2000. The TV film is based on Wasserstein's play of the same title, An American Daughter, which ran on Broadway in 1997.

Critical response
The Variety reviewer noted that the "screenplay is much more than an exploration into the mutual adulation of and animosity toward powerful women. It’s also a provocative look at the complex issues that converge when the definition of roles, be they gender or political, are called into question."

Awards and nominations
Golden Globe Awards
 Best Actress - Miniseries or Television Film (Lahti, nominated)

References

External links

2000 drama films
2000 television films
2000 films
American films based on plays
2000s English-language films
American television films
Films directed by Sheldon Larry